Brenda Fricker (born 17 February 1945) is an Irish actress, whose career has spanned six decades on stage and screen. She has appeared in more than 30 films and television roles. In 1990, she became the first Irish actress to win an Academy Award, earning the award for Best Supporting Actress for the biopic My Left Foot (1989). She also appeared in films such as The Field (1990), Home Alone 2: Lost in New York (1992), So I Married An Axe Murderer (1993), Angels in the Outfield (1994), A Time to Kill (1996), Veronica Guerin (2003), Inside I'm Dancing (2004) and Albert Nobbs (2011).

In 2008, Fricker was honoured with the inaugural Maureen O'Hara Award at the Kerry Film Festival. In 2020, The Irish Times ranked her 26th on its list of the greatest Irish film actors of all time.

Early life
Fricker was born in Dublin, Ireland. Her mother, "Bina" (née Murphy), was a teacher at Stratford College, and her father, Desmond Frederick Fricker, served in the Department of Agriculture and as 'Fred Desmond' a broadcaster with RTÉ and a journalist for The Irish Times.

Before becoming an actress, Fricker was assistant to the art editor of the Irish Times, with hopes of becoming a reporter. At age 19, she became an actress "by chance", her feature film career began with a small uncredited part in the 1964 film Of Human Bondage, based on the 1915 novel by W. Somerset Maugham. She also appeared in Tolka Row, Ireland's first soap opera.

Career
One of Fricker's first TV roles was staff nurse Maloney in Coronation Street, debuting on 10 January 1977. Brenda's character attended on the birth of Tracy Barlow on 24 January 1977's episode. Fricker came to wider public attention in the United Kingdom in another nursing role, as Megan Roach in the BBC One television drama series Casualty. Fricker bowed out as Megan in December 1990, after playing the character in 65 episodes, because she believed her character had "started off with a wonderful sense of humour, [but] lost it all and all she ever seemed to do was push a trolley around and offer tea and sympathy". In February 1998 she appeared in two episodes, with Megan attending the wedding of her former colleagues Charlie Fairhead and Barbara 'Baz' Samuels. In 2007, she returned for a single episode for Red Nose Day. The episode was written by Richard Curtis. Fricker's final appearance as Megan was in August 2010, when the character took a lethal cocktail of drugs to end her life.

Fricker found international acclaim after she won the Academy Award for Best Supporting Actress in 1990 for her performance as Christy Brown's mother in My Left Foot (1989). In her acceptance speech, Brenda thanked Brown "just for being alive" and also dedicated the Oscar to Brown's
mother, saying "anybody who gives birth 22 times deserves one of these". For her performance, Fricker was also nominated for a Golden Globe Award and she won the Los Angeles Film Critics Association Award for Best Supporting Actress as well. She rejoined My Left Foot writer and director Jim Sheridan to make the 1990 film The Field, starring alongside Richard Harris as Maggie McCabe, the wife of Harris' "Bull" McCabe. She continued her television work during this period, starring in the Australian-produced short series Brides of Christ (1991) and the miniseries Seekers (1992) alongside Josette Simon, produced by Sarah Lawson.

Buoyed by her Oscar win, Fricker went on to appear in several high-profile Hollywood films, most notably 1992's Home Alone 2: Lost in New York as the Central Park Pigeon Lady. In 1993, she portrayed May Mackenzie, the Weekly World News-obsessed Scottish mother of Mike Myers' Charlie Mackenzie, in So I Married an Axe Murderer, and then portrayed Joseph Gordon-Levitt's character's motherly caretaker Maggie in the 1994 family comedy Angels in the Outfield. One of her last Hollywood film roles came with A Time to Kill, as Ethel Twitty (loyal secretary to Matthew McConaughey's Jake Brigance), after which she has focused almost exclusively on film and television work in Canada, Ireland and the United Kingdom. In 2003, she played Bernie Guerin, mother of Veronica Guerin (played by Cate Blanchett) in the film of the same name. She then played nurse Eileen in the film Inside I'm Dancing. In 2007, she starred in How About You the film based on a short story about people living in a residential nursing home written by Maeve Binchy, playing Heather Nightangle. Other important roles were Omagh in 2004 as police Ombudsman Nuala O' Loan, as Graiine McFadden in the TV docudrama No Tears about the women treated with the blood product Anti D in the 1970s who had been contaminated with Hepatitis C, and as Aunt Maeve in Durango in 1999, based on the novel by John B. Keane.

Fricker has appeared in Closing the Ring, Richard Attenborough's post-World War II drama, also starring Shirley MacLaine, Christopher Plummer and Mischa Barton. In 2012, a high-profile supporting role in Albert Nobbs earned Fricker an Irish Film Award nomination, and along with Olympia Dukakis she became half of the first pair of Oscar-winning actors to play a same-sex couple in Cloudburst.

In 2021 Fricker joined the cast of the TV adaptation of Holding, based on the book of the same name by Graham Norton, marking her first major onscreen role in six years.

Personal life
Fricker currently lives in the Liberties, Dublin. She was previously married to director Barry Davies, until their divorce in 1988. She said that her loves include her pet dogs, drinking Guinness, reading poetry and playing snooker (she once stated that she had taken on the whole crew of My Left Foot. "I played pool against 17 of them, and beat them all," Brenda said).

In 2012, Fricker said "Of all the films I’ve made, only three do I remember where I felt I’d moved forward as an actress: Cloudburst, My Left Foot and The Field."

Awards and recognition
In 1989 she became the first Irish actress to win an Academy Award for her role in My Left Foot. Winning the Best Supporting Actress Award. 
In 2008, Fricker was honoured with the inaugural Maureen O'Hara Award at the Kerry Film Festival. In 2020, The Irish Times ranked her 26th on its list of the greatest Irish film actors of all time.

Filmography

Selected theatre work
 At the Royal National Theatre
 The Plough and the Stars
 Lavender Blue
 At the Royal Court Theatre
 Within Two Shadows
 A Pagan's Place
 At the Geffen Playhouse
 Cat on a Hot Tin Roof
 Other
 Typhad Mary
 Macbeth
 Outskirts
 TV Times
 The Accrington Pals
 The Irish Play
 Lost World
 The Weeping of Angels

See also
 List of people on the postage stamps of Ireland

References

External links
 
 MSN Movies profile
 Fricker at HOLBY.TV

1945 births
20th-century Irish actresses
21st-century Irish actresses
Actresses from Dublin (city)
Best Supporting Actress Academy Award winners
Irish film actresses
Irish television actresses
Living people
People from Dundrum, Dublin